Stinking may refer to:

Having an unpleasant odor
Stinking Creek (disambiguation)
Stinking Lake (New Mexico)
Stinking Point, a cape in Maryland and Virginia
Stinking River, a river in Virginia

See also
Stink (disambiguation)
Stinky (disambiguation)